The Southampton District Energy Scheme is a district heating and cooling system in Southampton, United Kingdom. The system is owned and operated by ENGIE.

History
In the 1980s the Department of Energy undertook a research and development programme to examine the potential of geothermal aquifers in the UK. However, after some initial success drilling a well in the Wessex Basin in 1981, it was deemed too small to be commercially viable. The project was abandoned by the Department of Energy, but Southampton City Council took the decision to create the UK's first geothermal power scheme. This was undertaken as part of a plan to become a ‘self sustaining city’ in energy generation, promoted by then-leader of the city council Alan Whitehead.

The system initially supplied only the Southampton Civic Centre, but was gradually expanded to serve over 1,000 residential properties, as well as the WestQuay shopping centre, the Royal South Hants Hospital, Solent University and the Carnival offices; and is part of an enlarged city centre district heating system that includes other combined heating, cooling and power sources.

By 2007, the system had  of pipes, and was producing 40GWh of heat, 22GWh of electricity and 8GWh of cooling per year.

By 2014, the system provided 7MW CHP, 2MW of geothermal power, and 1MW from biomass, saving 12,000tons CO2 per year.

See also

Geothermal power in the United Kingdom

References

District heating in the United Kingdom
District cooling in the United Kingdom
Southampton
Geothermal power stations in England
1986 establishments in England